Night Moves is a 2013 American drama thriller film directed by Kelly Reichardt and written by Reichardt and Jonathan Raymond, starring Jesse Eisenberg, Dakota Fanning, Peter Sarsgaard, Alia Shawkat, and James LeGros. The film follows three radical environmentalists who plot to blow up a dam. It was shown in the main competition section of the 70th Venice International Film Festival, at the 2013 Toronto International Film Festival and at 2013 Deauville American Film Festival, where it won Grand Prix of the festival.

Plot
Radical environmentalists Josh and Dena buy a boat and tow it long-distance to meet Harmon, an ex-Marine. The three buy fertilizer, assemble a bomb and load it onto the boat, planning to bomb a dam they believe is harming the environment. At night, they take the boat to the dam, arm the bomb, and escape. After the explosion, Harmon says goodbye and drives away. Josh and Dena are stopped by the police, but evade suspicion. The three agree not to contact each other again.

Josh returns to the farm where he lives and works. The other people living on the farm discuss the explosion; the media reports that a man who was camping near the dam is missing. Harmon calls Josh and tells him that Dena is worried. Concerned that she will go to the police, Josh agrees to talk to her. Dena admits her feelings of guilt and, when pressed by Josh, does not rule out talking to the police. Harmon tells Josh that Dena needs to be silenced.

The other people living on the farm suspect Josh of involvement with the bombing and ask him to leave. He learns that the missing man drowned in the flood caused by the explosion. Fearing that Dena will talk to the police, he surprises her at the spa where she works; he tries to warn her not to talk, but she attacks him and runs. He finds her hiding in one of the saunas, where he strangles her to death.

Josh calls Harmon in tears to tell him that Dena is dead. Harmon tells Josh to disappear and never contact him again. Josh destroys his phone and applies for a job at a camp supply store.

Cast
 Jesse Eisenberg as Josh
 Dakota Fanning as Dena
 Peter Sarsgaard as Harmon
 Alia Shawkat as Surprise
 Logan Miller as Dylan
 Kai Lennox as Sean
 Katherine Waterston as Anne
 Barry Del Sherman as Corser
 James LeGros as Feed Factory Clerk
 Jackie Apodaca as Woman at Spa
 Griffin Newman as Middle Manager

Production
Night Moves was shot on location in southern Oregon in the fall of 2012 over thirty days, using locations including the Chief Miwaleta Park in Azalea. The dam in the film is the Galesville Reservoir in the Klamath Mountains.
The film was dedicated in memory of production designer David Doernberg.

Controversy
Edward R. Pressman Film filed a lawsuit in September 2012, demanding that filming cease because of too many similarities to Edward Abbey's novel The Monkey Wrench Gang, planned to be adapted into an authorized film by Henry Joost and Ariel Schulman. The lawsuit charged:

The case was resolved through "negotiations behind the scenes", according to The Hollywood Reporter, and the action was dismissed on February 1, 2013. The film also borrows even more heavily from the Jim Harrison novel A Good Day to Die.

Reception
Night Moves received positive reviews, currently holding an 86% "certified fresh" rating on review aggregator website Rotten Tomatoes based on 153 reviews, with an average rating of 7.2/10; the consensus states: "A uniquely character-driven thriller with a finely composed cast and some outstanding direction from Kelly Reichardt, Night Moves bolsters its thought-provoking themes with compelling drama." On Metacritic, based on 36 critics, the film has a 75/100 rating, signifying "generally favorable reviews".

Peter Bradshaw of The Guardian awarded the film four out of five stars, praising the "three very closed and opaque performances: the direction does not offer up the film's meaning easily. Eisenberg is never a very demonstrative actor, but here he really is very withdrawn, giving an impression of a guy who has learned to tamp down his emotions. Fanning's Dena, too, is under control, again because she is aware of what is at stake and because she wishes to be taken seriously." Justin Chang of Variety commented on the film's pacing as uneven, noting: "Night Moves might have been close to perfect had it clocked in at a tight 80 minutes or so, rather than pushing on for another half-hour. While the fallout is impressively handled in its own way, the suspense and momentum inevitably dissipate as the story slowly moves toward a credulity-straining climax. Still, a feeling of deflation is entirely in keeping with the note Reichardt means to end on, and she finds just the right closing shot with which to convey exactly what her characters have and haven’t accomplished."

References

External links
 
 
 
 

2013 films
2013 independent films
2013 thriller drama films
American independent films
American thriller drama films
Eco-terrorism in fiction
Films about terrorism in the United States
Films directed by Kelly Reichardt
Films shot in Oregon
Murder in films
Films involved in plagiarism controversies
2013 drama films
2010s English-language films
2010s American films